Oyingbo Market is an ultramodern market complex located in Oyingbo, a metropolitan city in Ebute Metta area of Lagos State. The market is one of the oldest and busiest markets in Lagos thereby contributing a large quota to the economy of the state.

History
Oyingbo market was established during the early 1920s as a depot for agricultural produce. The market gradually expanded due to developments around the Oyingbo, Ebute Metta and Lagos Mainland regions.

In the 1930s, traders from Apapa Road were moved to Oyingbo market to further boost the size of the market with the view of making the market a major commercial centre that will attract customers from every part of Nigeria.

Basic structure
Onyingbo market was demolished under the administration of the then Chairman of Lagos Island local government in a bid to rebuild it into an ultramodern market through partnership with the private sector inviting Chief M.K.O Abiola to lay the foundation of the new market.

In 2015, former Governor of Lagos State Babatunde Fashola commissioned the new modernised market after efforts to rebuild the market moved from one administration to the other.

The new ultramodern Oyingbo market complex is a four-storey building built on a 504 square meters land with about 150-car capacity parking lot on the ground floor, 622 open shops, 102 lockup shops, 48 open offices, 134 toilets and six exit gates. The reconstruction of the market is estimated to have been built at the cost of ₦1billion.

See also
 List of markets in Lagos

References

Lagos Mainland
Retail markets in Lagos